Alessio Girgi (born 1 April 2000) is an Italian professional footballer who plays as a defender for  club Torres.

Club career
On 14 January 2022, he joined Feralpisalò in Serie C on loan.

References

External links 
 
 
 

2000 births
Living people
Footballers from Genoa
Italian footballers
Association football defenders
Serie C players
Genoa C.F.C. players
Atalanta B.C. players
U.S. Pergolettese 1932 players
F.C. Legnago Salus players
Carrarese Calcio players
FeralpiSalò players
S.E.F. Torres 1903 players